Edward John Albosta (October 27, 1918 – January 7, 2003), nicknamed "Rube", was a pitcher in Major League Baseball. He pitched for the Brooklyn Dodgers in 1941 and the Pittsburgh Pirates in 1946. In between he served three years in the U.S. Army during World War II. He played semi-pro ball after that, retiring in 1954. His best record was in 1951 when he went 19–11 for Saginaw.

Albosta died January 7, 2003.

References

External links

Baseball-almanac page

1918 births
2003 deaths
United States Army personnel of World War II
Baseball players from Michigan
Beckley Bengals players
Brooklyn Dodgers players
Carman Cardinals players
Dayton Wings players
Durham Bulls players
Hollywood Stars players
Hot Springs Bathers players
Indianapolis Indians players
Major League Baseball pitchers
Minor league baseball managers
Minot Mallards players
Montreal Royals players
Pittsburgh Pirates players
Saginaw Bears players
Saginaw Jacks players
Sportspeople from Saginaw, Michigan
Toledo Mud Hens players
United States Army soldiers
American expatriate baseball people in Canada